"Dominique" is a 1963 French song by Sœur Sourire, also known as the Singing Nun.

Dominique may also refer to:

 Dominique (name), a given name and surname
 Dominique chicken, a chicken breed
 Dominique (1978 film), a British film directed by Michael Anderson
 Dominique (1950 film), a French comedy film directed by Yvan Noé
 Dominique (album), a 2015 album by NEØV

See also 

 Dominic (disambiguation)
 Dominica, an island nation in the Caribbean Sea
 'Nique (disambiguation)